Walla Walla can refer to:

 Walla Walla people, a Native American tribe after which the county and city of Walla Walla, Washington, are named
 Place of many rocks in the Australian Aboriginal Wiradjuri language, the origin of the name of the town of Walla Walla in New South Wales

Places and jurisdictions

United States
 Walla Walla River, the river along which the Walla Walla tribe lived
 Walla Walla County, Washington
 Walla Walla, Washington, a city in Walla Walla County
 the former Roman Catholic Diocese of Walla Walla, whose territory is currently ministered by the Roman Catholic Diocese of Spokane
 Walla Walla Community College
 Washington State Penitentiary, also called "Walla Walla State Penitentiary"
 Walla Walla University, in College Place, Washington (a Walla Walla suburb)
 Walla Walla Valley AVA, wine region in the Walla Walla Valley
 Fort Walla Walla, also known as Fort Nez Percés
 Walla Walla Regional Airport
 Walla Walla reservation
 Walla Walla, Illinois

Australia
 Walla Walla, New South Wales, a town

Other uses
 Walla Walla Council (1855), creating the Treaty of Walla Walla
 MV Walla Walla, a Jumbo class ferry in the Washington State Ferry System
 Walla Walla Football Club, located in New South Wales, Australia
 Walla Walla, a Jamaican term meaning to "roll around" in something (mud, dirt, etc.)
 Walla-walla, a kind of motorboat used in Hong Kong
 Walla Walla Sweets, baseball team in Walla Walla, Washington
 "Walla Walla", a song on The Offspring's album Americana
 "Walla Walla", a song on Glass Animals' album Zaba

See also
 Walla (disambiguation)
 Wala (disambiguation)
 Wallah (disambiguation)